Daniel Gillois (5 February 1888 – 28 December 1959) was a French equestrian. He won a silver medal in team dressage at the 1936 Summer Olympics in Berlin, together with André Jousseaume and Gérard de Balorre.

References

Sportspeople from Fontainebleau
1888 births
1959 deaths
French male equestrians
Olympic equestrians of France
Olympic silver medalists for France
Equestrians at the 1936 Summer Olympics
Olympic medalists in equestrian
Medalists at the 1936 Summer Olympics
20th-century French people